The 2016 Wakefield Metropolitan Borough Council election took place on 5 May 2016 to elect members of Wakefield Metropolitan District Council in England. This was on the same day as other local elections. The Labour Party and the Conservative Party fielded a full slate of 21 candidates, with UK Independence Party putting forward 11 candidates, 9 Liberal Democrat candidates, 6 Trade Union and Socialist Coalition candidates, 5 Yorkshire First candidates, 3 Green Party candidates and 4 Independent candidates.

Council Make-up
The make up of the Council following the election was:

Summary 

 
 +/- compared with Wakefield Council election 2015.

Ward results

Ackworth, North Elmsall and Upton ward

Airedale and Ferry Fryston ward

Altofts and Whitwood ward

Castleford Central and Glasshoughton ward

Crofton, Ryhill and Walton ward

Featherstone ward

Hemsworth ward

Horbury and South Ossett ward

Knottingley ward

Normanton ward

Ossett ward

Pontefract North ward

Pontefract South

South Elmsall and South Kirkby ward

Stanley and Outwood East ward

Wakefield East ward

Wakefield North ward

Wakefield Rural ward

Wakefield South ward

Wakefield West ward

Wrenthorpe and Outwood West ward

References

2016 English local elections
2016
2010s in West Yorkshire